Big Jay is one of the costume mascots of the Kansas Jayhawks. Together, Big Jay and Baby Jay are Jayhawks and are the mascots used by the University of Kansas. Another mascot named Centennial Jay was temporarily used in 2012.

See also
 List of U.S. college mascots

References

Big 12 Conference mascots
Kansas Jayhawks